Yury Vasilevich Starunsky (April 17, 1945 – December 24, 2010) was a Soviet volleyball player who competed for the Soviet Union in the 1972 Summer Olympics and in the 1976 Summer Olympics.

In 1972 he was part of the Soviet team which won the bronze medal in the Olympic tournament. He played all seven matches.

Four years later he won the silver medal with the Soviet team in the 1976 Olympic tournament. He played all five matches.

External links
 
 
  

1945 births
2010 deaths
Sportspeople from Kyiv
Soviet men's volleyball players
Olympic volleyball players of the Soviet Union
Volleyball players at the 1972 Summer Olympics
Volleyball players at the 1976 Summer Olympics
Olympic silver medalists for the Soviet Union
Olympic bronze medalists for the Soviet Union
Olympic medalists in volleyball
Ukrainian men's volleyball players
Russian men's volleyball players
Medalists at the 1976 Summer Olympics
Medalists at the 1972 Summer Olympics